The Canadian Armed Forces currently lists 84 military occupations that are performed by either officer or non-commissioned members.  Many occupations – such as training and development officer - are common across all three branches, while others - such as sonar operator - are specific to one element.

Occupations

Current
The following is a list of the current military occupations across all three branches ("elements") of the Canadian military:

Former
The following list contains former occupations that have either been renamed or removed altogether:

References

Occupations
Military specialisms